In Sumerian and Akkadian mythology Asaruludu is one of the Anunnaki. His name is also spelled Namshub, Asarludu, and Asarluhi.  The etymology and meaning of his name are unclear.

Asaruludu served as an exorcist in Sumerian religious rituals.  

As Namshub (shining), he is considered a protective deity, "the shining god that illuminates our path". The Enuma Elish describes Asaruludu as "the light of the gods". Another version states he is "the wielder of the flaming sword" and "ensures the most perfect safety".

History 
Early evidence does not associate Asaruludu with incantations and magic, but rather with the city of Kuara.  Asaruludu, as the patron deity of Kuara, may have been subsumed into the pantheon of Eridu (Enki's city) and thus acquired his role as a god of incantations.  Sometimes Asalluhi plays an intermediary role, introducing the patient to Enki/Ea.  

Later texts describe Asaruludu as the son of Enki/Ea, who shares Enki/Ea's qualities of intelligence, counsel and "wide reason", as well as expertise in incantations.  Asaraludu often bears the epithets "son of Eridu" or the "son of Abzu," Enki/Ea's realm of subterranean waters.  

Asaruludu was later syncretized with Marduk; in the Enuma Elish, Asalluhi is one of Marduk's fifty names.

Time Periods 
Asaruludu is first attested in the Ur III period, and appears most frequently in Neo-Assyrian, Achaemenid, and Seleucid incantations. The so-called "Weidner god list," mentions Asalluhi right before Marduk.

Use in popular culture
 The term nam-shub was used by Neal Stephenson in his novel Snow Crash for an information hazard.

References 
This page includes text adapted from the Ancient Mesopotamian Gods and Goddesses Project, a production of the UK Higher Education Academy's Subject Centre for History, Classics, and Archaeology.

Further reading
Asalluhi in The Electronic Text Corpus of Sumerian Literature
 Brigitte Groneberg: Die Götter des Zweistromlandes. Kulte, Mythen, Epen. Artemis & Winkler, Stuttgart 2004, .
Cunningham, G. 1997. Deliver Me From Evil: Mesopotamian Incantations 2500-1500 BC. Rome.
Helmut Freydank et al.: Lexikon Alter Orient. Ägypten * Indien * China * Vorderasien. VMA-Verlag, Wiesbaden 1997, 

Mesopotamian gods